The Four Doctors is a Big Finish Productions full cast audio drama based on the long-running British science fiction television series Doctor Who.  It was originally free to subscribers of The Demons of Red Lodge and Other Stories, but can now be selected with any Big Finish subscription.

Plot
The Fifth Doctor investigates the Vault of Stellar Curios, where he has observed evidence of time leakage.  But then the Daleks attack, looking for the contents of the mysterious vault.  The Eighth Doctor also shows up and he and his former self create a time loop trap, spanning between their lives.  This sends the Daleks to the Seventh Doctor's encounter with Michael Faraday in 1854 and the Sixth Doctor's visit to an early Dalek battlefield.

Cast
Fifth Doctor – Peter Davison
Sixth Doctor – Colin Baker
Seventh Doctor – Sylvester McCoy
Eighth Doctor – Paul McGann
Daleks – Nicholas Briggs
Professor Kalinda/Lady Cowen – Ellie Burrow
Colonel Ulrik/Whitmore – David Bamber
Michael Faraday/Magran – Nigel Lambert
Roboman/Jariden Device – Alex Mallinson

External links

news 
more news 

2010 audio plays
Fifth Doctor audio plays
Sixth Doctor audio plays
Seventh Doctor audio plays
Eighth Doctor audio plays
Doctor Who multi-Doctor stories
Dalek audio plays